Nanna Koochi (Translation: Daddy Koochi) is a 2018 Indian Telugu-language drama web series directed by Pranith Bramandapally and produced by Niharika Konidela through Pink Elephant Pictures. The series has an ensemble cast of Niharika Konidela, Nagendra Babu and Poondla Abhijeeth. The 8-episodes series premiered on ZEE5 on 12 February 2018. It is the first Telugu-language web series on ZEE5.

Premise

Cast 

 Niharika Konidela as Tara
 Nagendra Babu as Anandraj
 Poondla Abhijeeth as Luv
 Sivaji Raja
 Neelya Bhavani as Parvathi
 Jabaradasth Rakesh as Banthi
 Bhavana Rao
 Master Bharath
 Kalki Raja
 Karthik Appala

Production 
After producing successful series Muddapappu Avakai, Niharika again produced this web series. Filiming took place in Hyderabad in late 2017.

Episodes 
There are eight episodes written and directed by Pranith Bramandapally. Niharika is the dialogue writer along with Pranith.

Reception 
Karthik Keramulu of Firstpost wrote that Nanna Koochi is one of the better Telugu web series even though its essence isn't all that powerful in the face of Tamil series like As I'm Suffering From Kadhal and Livin’. He also added that Kaala Bhairava's background score packs a solid punch. It's pleasing to the ears and all the other senses. The theme music that pops up during the beginning and end credits deserve a lot of love and multiple listenings.

References

External links 
 Nanna Koochi on ZEE5

2018 web series debuts
2018 web series endings
Telugu-language web series
2018 Indian television series debuts
2018 Indian television series endings
ZEE5 original programming
Indian drama web series
Indian drama television series